Joshua "Poison" Onyango (born 1 December 1975 in Kisumu) is a Kenyan professional welter/light middle/middleweight boxer of the 1990s, 2000s and 2010s who won the Kenya welterweight title, East & Central African Professional Boxing Federation welterweight title, and Commonwealth light middleweight title, and was a challenger for the International Boxing Federation (IBF) Inter-Continental light welterweight title against Sergey Bashkirov, his professional fighting weight varied from , i.e. Middleweight.

References

External links

1975 births
Light-middleweight boxers
Middleweight boxers
People from Kisumu County
Welterweight boxers
Living people
Kenyan male boxers